Samford Rural District was a rural district within the administrative county of East Suffolk between 1894 and 1974. It was created out of the earlier Samford rural sanitary district. It was named after the historic hundred of Samford, whose boundaries it closely matched.

Under the East Suffolk County Review Order of 1934, the only changes made were a revision of the boundary with the county borough of Ipswich. This boundary was revised again in 1952.

Under the Local Government Act 1972, Samford Rural District was abolished in 1974, and its area became part of the district of Babergh.

Statistics

Parishes
Samford RD contained the parishes of Belstead, Bentley, Brantham, Burstall, Capel St Mary, Chattisham, Chelmondiston, Copdock, East Bergholt, Erwarton, Freston, Great Wenham, Harkstead, Higham, Hintlesham, Holbrook, Holton St Mary, Little Wenham, Raydon, Shelley, Shotley, Sproughton, Stratford St Mary, Stutton, Tattingstone, Washbrook, Wherstead and Woolverstone.

References

History of Suffolk
Districts of England created by the Local Government Act 1894
Rural districts of England